The Battle of Alcantra was fought at Alcantra, on the Alamo River on 3–4 October 1839 between insurgents under the command of General Antonio Canales Rosillo, and Centerists under the command of General José Ignacio Pavón. The insurgents won decisive victory which led to Pavón being replaced by General Mariano Arista.

Notes

References

Further reading

1839 in Mexico
Alcantra